<onlyinclude>

November 2022

See also

References

killings by law enforcement officers
 11